Utricle (Latin: utriculus, diminutive of utur, meaning "leather bag") may refer to:
 Utricle (ear), a part of the inner ear
 Macula of utricle
 Utricle (fruit), a type of dry fruit similar to an achene
 Utricle (seaweed), an air filled sac in certain seaweeds
 Prostatic utricle, a small indentation in the prostate